Labroots is a scientific social networking website, founded in 2008. The site offers trending news and educational virtual events and webinars in many areas of science and medicine.

Labroots events and webinars primarily focus on health, medicine, and other biotechnology-oriented fields.

History 
Labroots was co-founded in 2008 by Greg and Don Cruikshank, and in 2009 acquired BioConference Live.

Virtual events 
Labroots hosts virtual events in many scientific fields such as microbiology and neuroscience.

References

External links 
Labroots - Main Page

American social networking websites
Scientific organizations based in the United States